The Skipper Surprised His Wife is a 1950 film directed by Elliott Nugent and starring Robert Walker and Joan Leslie.

Plot
The skipper, Cmdr. William Lattimer (Robert Walker) whose wife Daphne (Joan Leslie) is incapacitated by a broken leg, forcing the skipper takes over management of their home. A stickler for nautical discipline, Lattimer tries to run things "the Navy way," but this proves not only futile but ridiculous.

Cast
 Robert Walker as Cmdr. William J. Lattimer
 Joan Leslie as Daphne Lattimer
 Edward Arnold as Adm. Homer Thorndyke
 Spring Byington as Agnes Thorndyke
 Leon Ames as Dr. Phillip Abbott
 Jan Sterling as Rita Rossini
 Anthony Ross as Joe Rossini
 Paul Harvey as Brendon Boyd
 Kathryn Card as Thelma Boyd
 Tommy Myers as Tommy Lattimer
 Rudy Lee as Davey Lattimer
 Finnegan Weatherwax as Muscles

Reception
According to MGM records, the film earned $733,000 in the US and Canada and $193,000 overseas, leading to a loss of $181,000.

References

External links
 
 
 
 

1950 films
Films directed by Elliott Nugent
1950 comedy films
Metro-Goldwyn-Mayer films
American comedy films
Films scored by Bronisław Kaper
American black-and-white films
1950s English-language films
1950s American films